The Norse group is a large group of retrograde irregular satellites of Saturn. Their semi-major axes range between 12 and 24 Gm, their inclinations between 136° and 175° and their eccentricities between 0.13 and 0.77. Unlike for the Inuit and Gallic groups, the orbital parameters are widely dispersed and group is likely to be composed from a number of subgroups with more homogenous orbital and physical parameters.  For example, the satellites with inclinations around 174 degrees alone are thought to comprise at least two subgroups. Eight other moons form the Skathi subgroup. Their semi-major axes range between 15 and 20 Gm, their inclinations between 147° and 158°. Narvi forms a separate subgroup with Bestla. The International Astronomical Union (IAU) reserves names taken from Norse mythology (mostly giants) for these moons. The exception is Phoebe (Greek mythology), the largest, which was discovered long before the others.

The discovery of 17 new moons in this group was announced in October 2019. One of these is the most distant moon of Saturn. A public naming contest for these moons was announced, restricted to names from Norse mythology. Ten of these moons received official names in August 2022.

The members of the group are (in order of increasing distance from Saturn):
Phoebe
Skathi (Skathi subgroup)
S/2004 S 37
S/2007 S 2
Skoll (Skathi subgroup)
Hyrrokkin (Skathi subgroup)
Greip
Mundilfari
S/2004 S 13
S/2006 S 1 (Skathi subgroup)
S/2007 S 3
Suttungr
Gridr
Jarnsaxa
Narvi (Narvi subgroup)
Bergelmir (Skathi subgroup)
Hati
S/2004 S 17
S/2004 S 12
Eggther
Farbauti (Skathi subgroup)
Thrymr
Bestla (Narvi subgroup)
S/2004 S 7
Aegir
Beli (Skathi subgroup)
Angrboda
Gerd
Gunnlod (Skathi subgroup)
Skrymir
S/2006 S 3 (Skathi subgroup)
Alvaldi
Kari (Skathi subgroup)
S/2004 S 28
Loge
Geirrod (Skathi subgroup)
Fenrir
Ymir
Surtur
Thiazzi
S/2004 S 21 (Skathi subgroup)
S/2004 S 39
S/2004 S 36 (Narvi subgroup)
Fornjot
Saturn LXIV
Saturn LVIII

See also
 Stats of planets in the Solar System
 List of natural satellites

References

External links
 S. Sheppard's classification of Saturn's irregular moons

Norse group
Moons of Saturn
Irregular satellites
Moons with a retrograde orbit